In Tibetan Buddhism and Bön, Zhitro or Shitro zab-chos zhi khro dgongs pa rang grol, also known as kar-gling zhi-khro refers to a cycle of teachings revealed by the terton Karma Lingpa and traditionally believed to have been written by Padmasambhava. The practices involve a mandala of 100 peaceful (zhi) and wrathful (khro) tantric deities and associated teachings and tantric practices which focus on those deities which represent the purified elements of the body and mind. These hundred peaceful and wrathful deities are believed to manifest to a deceased person following the dissolution of the body and consciousness whilst they are in the intermediate state, or bardo, between death and rebirth. The Bardo Thodol, commonly known in the West as "The Tibetan Book of the Dead", forms one section of Karma Lingpa's Zhitro cycle. The Zhitro teachings are closely related to the Guhyagarbha Tantra and are considered an Inner Tantra.

Exegesis

A prominent sadhana, or practice text, is part of a group of bardo teachings which are held in the Nyingma tradition to have originated with Padmasambhava in the 8th century and were rediscovered as terma, or 'treasure teachings' in the 14th century by the tertön Karma Lingpa. The Zhitro mandala teachings were found in the same terma collection as the Bardo Thodol, a text well known in the West as The Tibetan Book of the Dead.

The Dzogchen practice of Zhitro involves viewing the body as a mandala of both peaceful and wrathful deities, the inclusivity promoting awareness in the practitioner of the universality of Buddha-nature. As a subtle body practice using yogic practices to manipulate the lung, or subtle-winds, of the body, this is a completion stage practice of the Inner Tantras. The Lion's Roar Tantric Glossary describes the Zhitro mandala practice:
Zhi-khro is a practice of Tibetan Buddhism involving visualizing the body as a composite of the 100 peaceful and wrathful deities. In the practice, the deities are first visualized in mandalas of 42 peaceful and 58 wrathful deities centered in the heart, throat and crown chakra, and then in all the channels and nadis of the body.

Shugchang, et al. (2000) define and frame the Zhi-khro teachings in relation to the Inner Tantras, Anuyoga, Atiyoga, Guhyagarbha tantra, rigpa, Śūnyatā, non-duality, kye-rim, dzog-rim and bardo:
The zhi-khro, which translates as the peaceful and wrathful deities, is considered part of the inner tantra. It is actually a condensed teaching based upon the essential
meaning of the Guhyagarbha Tantra combined with the views expressed in the anu and ati yoga teachings. Many great masters have said that the zhi-khro teachings are the inner tantra of the inner tantra. In this case we're not making distinctions among the various inner tantras, nor between the creation and completion stages, but joining them all together. This is the union of rigpa and emptiness, the oneness of birth, death, and life experiences. There is no basis for discriminating because all are aspects of one true nature. Nothing is rejected or exclusively accepted. This teaching is known as the one that unifies everything into a single state.

Janet Gyatso (2006) relates how Zhitro was received by Yeshe Tsogyal through the wang of a Vidyadhara:
She... is robbed by seven bandits whom she then converts to Buddhist practice. She proceeds with the bandits on a magic carpet to the place Oḍḍiyāna where they all receive peaceful and wrathful deity practice (zhitro) initiations from a vidyādhara, who gives her the secret name Kharchen Za and cavorts in bliss with her.

See also
Bardo
Bardo Thodol
Guhyagarbha Tantra
Six realms
Reality in Buddhism
Tantra techniques (Vajrayana)

Notes

External links
Shitro 100 Deity Practice: Prayers for the Dying and Understanding the Bardo
The True Foundation of Practice: By Tulku Urgyen Rinpoche
Significant detail and listing of the Hundred_peaceful_and_wrathful_deities with their Wylie transcription
The death ritual as guidance through the Bardo. "Secret Doctrienes of the tibetan book of the dead", Detlef Ingo Lauf, Shambala 1977

Dzogchen texts
Dzogchen practices
Nyingma tantras
Tibetan words and phrases